On This Winter's Night is the fourth studio album and first Christmas album by American country music trio Lady Antebellum. It was released on October 22, 2012, by Capitol Records Nashville. The production on the album was handled by the group's longtime producer Paul Worley. This album includes the six tracks from their previous 2010 Christmas EP A Merry Little Christmas as noted below. 

A music video was produced for "A Holly Jolly Christmas". On October 26, 2020, the group announced the release of a deluxe edition with 4 new tracks under their new name of Lady A.

Commercial performance
On This Winter's Night debuted at number nine on the US Billboard 200 chart, selling 25,000 copies in its first week. This became Lady Antebellum's fourth US top-ten debut. In its sixth week, the album returned to the top-ten, reaching a new peak at number eight selling 59,000 copies. On December 13, 2012, the album was certified gold by the Recording Industry Association of America (RIAA) for shipments of over 500,000 copies in the US. As of November 2017, the album has sold 648,500 copies in the United States.

Track listing

Source:

Personnel
Lady Antebellum
Dave Haywood –  acoustic guitar, electric guitar, background vocals
Charles Kelley –  lead vocals, background vocals
Hillary Scott –  lead vocals, background vocals

Additional personnel

Roy Agee –  trombone
Sam Bacco –  percussion
Jeff Bailey –  trumpet
Denver Bierman –  choir
Jaclyn Brown –  choir
Kristyn Burke –  choir
Lori Casteel –  choir
Julie Cox –  choir
Chad Cromwell –  drums
Mark Douthit –  alto saxophone
Mike Eldred –  choir
Ashley Escobar –  choir
Tom Fudge –  choir
Jose Fulgeuiro –  choir
Jason "Slim" Gambill –  electric guitar
Barry Green –  trombone, bass trombone
Ryan Greenawalt –  choir
Darrika Hammonds –  choir
David Huff –  drum loops, percussion
Carlos Jara –  choir
Shelley Jennings –  choir
Tammy Jensen –  choir
Bonnie Keen –  choir
Shelby Kernodle –  choir
Melody Kirkpatrick –  choir
Ana Leonard –  choir

Sam Levine –  tenor saxophone
Carsan Lindsey –  choir
Rahni Lindsey –  choir
Gloria Lomax –  choir
Myra Lomax –  choir
Gil Long –  tuba
Rob McNelley –  electric guitar
Doug Moffett –  baritone saxophone
The Nashville String Machine –  strings
Steve Patrick –  trumpet
Larry Paxton –  bass guitar, horn arrangements, string arrangements
Kayla Pritchett –  choir
Chloe Randall –  choir
Bryan Robinson –  choir
Gary Robinson –  choir
Chris Rodriguez –  electric guitar
Mike Rojas –  Fender Rhodes, Hammond B-3 organ, piano, synthesizer
Desirea Swanson –  choir
Jarquica Turner –  choir
Biff Watson –  acoustic guitar
Stephanie Wedan –  choir
Kris Wilkinson –  horn arrangements, string arrangements
Garris Wimmer –  choir
David Wise –  choir
Craig Young –  bass guitar
Jonathan Yudkin –  fiddle, harp, mandolin

Charts

Weekly charts

Year-end charts

Certifications

References

2012 Christmas albums
Albums produced by Paul Worley
Lady A albums
Capitol Records Christmas albums
Christmas albums by American artists
Country Christmas albums